Durmut (also spelled Durmuth) is a village, in Contai 3 CD Block in Contai subdivision of Purba Medinipur district in the state of West Bengal, India.

Geography

Location

Urbanisation
93.55% of the population of Contai subdivision live in the rural areas. Only 6.45% of the population live in the urban areas and it is considerably behind Haldia subdivision in urbanization, where 20.81% of the population live in urban areas.

Note: The map alongside presents some of the notable locations in the subdivision. All places marked in the map are linked in the larger full screen map.

Demographics
As per 2011 Census of India Durmut had a total population of 4,617 of which 2,378 (52%) were males and 2,239 (48%) were females. Population below 6 years was 461. The total number of literates in Durmut was 3,648 (87.78% of the population over 6 years).

Transport
Durmut is off National Highway 116B (Digha Road).

Education
Deshapran Mahavidyalaya at Durmuth was established in 2010 and offers courses in arts.

References

Villages in Purba Medinipur district